Hypocysta irius, the northern ringlet or orange-streaked ringlet, is a species of butterfly of the family Nymphalidae. It is found in Australia, including Queensland and New South Wales.

The wingspan is about 30 mm. Adults are brown with an orange patch on each wing and an eyespot on each hindwing. The underside of the wings is brown with two eyespots on each hindwing.

The larvae feed on Imperata (including Imperata cylindrica) and Tetrarrhena species. They are green with a yellow forked tail, and a brown head. Full-grown larvae are about 15 mm long. Pupation takes place in a mottled brown pupa.

References

Satyrini
Butterflies described in 1775
Taxa named by Johan Christian Fabricius